Cyphophoenix elegans is a species of palm tree in the family Arecaceae. It is found only in New Caledonia.

References 

elegans
Endemic flora of New Caledonia
Vulnerable plants
Plants described in 1887
Taxonomy articles created by Polbot
Taxa named by Adolphe-Théodore Brongniart